The women's singles four wood is one of the events at the annual Bowls England National Championships.

The four-wood singles is the traditional variation of the game; see Glossary of bowls terms.

Past winners

References

Bowls in England